Jeong Mong-ju (Korean: 정몽주, Hanja: 鄭夢周,  January 13, 1338 – April 26, 1392), also known by his pen name Poeun (Korean: 포은), was a historical figure during the transition period of the Korean dynasty moving from Goryeo (918-1392) to Joseon (1392-1897).

He was the last great figure of Goryeo in the late Goryeo period, and was exceptional in all aspects of academics, diplomacy, economics, military, and politics.
He tried to reform Goryeo while maintaining the declining kingdom.
He was opposed to Yi Seong-gye (the 1st king of Joseon) who was a radical revolutionary.
He was assassinated by the men of Yi Bang-won (the 3rd king of Joseon), the son of Yi Seong-gye.

Biography
Jeong Mong-ju was born in Yeongcheon, Gyeongsang province to a family from the Yeonil Jeong clan. At the age of 23, he took three different civil service literary examinations (Gwageo) and received the highest marks possible on each of them. In 1367, he became an instructor in Neo-Confucianism at the Gukjagam, then called Songgyungwan, whilst simultaneously holding a government position, and was a faithful public servant to King U. The king had great confidence in his wide knowledge and good judgment, and so he participated in various national projects and his scholarly works earned him great respect in the Goryeo court.

In 1372, Jeong Mong-ju visited the Ming Dynasty as a diplomatic envoy. Around this time, as Waegu (왜구/ 倭寇) (Japanese pirate) invasions to the Korean Peninsula were extreme, Jeong Mong-ju was dispatched as a delegate to Kyūshū in Japan, in 1377. His negotiations led to promises of Japanese aid in defeating the pirates. At this time, the tandai of Kyūshū, Imagawa Sadayo, made several repressions against the Waegu, probably as a direct result of Jeong Mong-ju's diplomacy. There is reason to believe that Sadayo and Jeong Mong-ju negotiated directly as later Sadayo lost his position due to unlawful negotiations with Korea. Jeong Mong-ju traveled to the Ming Dynasty's capital city in 1384 and the negotiations with the Chinese led to peace with the Ming Dynasty in 1385. He also founded an institute devoted to the theories of Confucianism.

After a banquet held for him, Jeong Mong-ju was assassinated in 1392 by five men on the Sonjuk Bridge in Gaeseong. Politically motivated, the murder was ordered by Yi Bang-won (later Taejong of Joseon), the fifth son of Yi Seong-gye, who overthrew the Goryeo Dynasty in order to establish the Joseon Dynasty. Jeong Mong-ju was murdered because as he was a Goryeo Dynasty loyalist, and Yi Bang-won sought to eliminate his political opponents. Yi Bang-won recited a poem (Hayeoga, 하여가 / 何如歌) to dissuade Jeong Mong-ju from remaining loyal to the Goryeo court, but Jeong Mong-ju answered with another poem (Dansimga, 단심가 / 丹心歌) that affirmed his loyalty. Yi Seong-gye is said to have lamented Jeong Mong-ju's death and rebuked his son because Jeong Mong-ju was a highly regarded politician by the common people. The bridge where Jeong Mong-ju was murdered, nowadays in North Korea, has now become a national monument of that country. A brown spot on one of the stones is said to be Jeong Mong-ju's bloodstain and is said to become red whenever it rains. Currently, his direct surviving descendants are his 28th - 36th generation, who reside all over the world.

The 474-year-old Goryeo Dynasty symbolically ended with Jeong Mong-ju's death and was followed by the Joseon Dynasty for 505 years (1392-1897). Jeong Mong-ju's noble death symbolizes his faithful allegiance to the king, and he was later venerated even by Joseon monarchs. In 1517, 125 years after his death, he was canonized into Sungkyunkwan (the National Academy) alongside other Korean sages such as Yi Hwang (Toegye, 1501-1570) and Yi I (Yulgok, 1536-1584). His grave is in Yongin, Gyeonggi-do, and he was buried with his wife.

The 11th pattern of ITF Taekwondo is named after Poeun. The pattern is performed as part of the testing syllabus for the level of 2nd-degree black belt. The diagram ( - ) represents Jeong Mong-ju's unerring loyalty to his king and his country towards the end of the Goryeo Dynasty.

Family 
 Great-Grandfather
 Jeong In-su (정인수, 鄭仁壽)
 Grandfather
 Jeong Yu (정유, 鄭裕)
 Father
 Jeong Woon-gwan (정운관, 鄭云瓘) (? - 1355)
 Mother
 Grand Princess Consort Byeon of the Yeongcheon Lee clan (변한국대부인 영천 이씨)
 Siblings 
 Younger brother - Jeong Gwa (정과, 鄭過) (? - 1392)
 Younger brother - Jeong Hu (정후, 鄭厚)
 Younger brother - Jeong Do (정도, 鄭蹈)
 Wife and children 
 Princess Gyeongsun of the Gyeongju Yi clan (경순택주 경주 이씨, 敬順宅主 慶州 李氏) (? - 12 December 1392)
 Son - Jeong Jong-seong (정종성, 鄭宗誠) (1374 - 1442)
 Grandson - Jeong Bo (정보, 鄭保)
 Granddaughter-in-law - Lady Park of the Juksan Park clan (정부인 죽산 박씨); daughter of Park Jung-yong (박중용)
 Great-Granddaughter - Lady Jeong of the Yeonil Jeong clan (연일 정씨)
 Great Grandson-in-law -  Yi Seok-hyeong (이석형, 李石亨) of the Yeonan Yi clan (1415 - 1477)
 Great-Great-Grandson - Yi Hun (이혼, 李渾) (1445 - ?)
 Great-Granddaughter - Lady Jeong of the Yeonil Jeong clan (연일 정씨)
 Great Grandson-in-law - Yi Gye-son (이계손, 李繼孫) of the Yeoheung Yi clan (1423 - 1484)
 Great-Granddaughter - Lady Jeong of the Yeonil Jeong clan (연일 정씨)
 Great Grandson-in-law - Lee Ji (이지, 李墀) of the Goseong Lee clan (1420 - ?)
 Great-Great-Grandson - Yi Ryuk (이륙, 李陸) (1438 - 1498)
 Great-Great-Grandson - Yi Maek (이맥, 李陌) (1455 - 1528)
 Granddaughter-in-law - Lady Park of the Miryang Park clan (밀양 박씨); daughter of Park Deung (박등, 朴登)
 Great-Grandson - Jeong Yun-hwa (정윤화, 鄭允和) or Jeong Won-hwa (정원화, 鄭元和) (1453 - ?)
 Granddaughter - Princess Consort Ohcheon of the Yeonil Jeong clan (오천군부인 연일 정씨); Prince Seonseong’s first wife 
 Grandson-in-law - Yi Mu-saeng, Prince Seonseong (선성군 이무생) (1392 - 1460)
 Great-Granddaughter - Lady Yi of the Jeonju Yi clan (전주 이씨, 全州 李氏)
 Great Grandson-in-law - Jo Chung-ro (조충로, 趙忠老) of the Pyeongyang Jo clan 
 Half-Granddaughter - Lady Jeong of the Yeonil Jeong clan (연일 정씨); became a concubine 
 Half grandson-in-law - Han Myeong-hoe (한명회, 韓明澮) (26 November 1415 - 28 November 1487)
 Son - Jeong Jong-bun (정종본, 鄭宗本) (1377 - 1443)
 Unnamed concubine 
 Son - Jeong Jong-hwa (정종화)
 Granddaughter - Lady Jeong of the Yeonil Jeong clan (정경부인 정씨, 貞敬夫人 鄭氏); became a concubine
 Grandson-in-law - Han Myeong-hoe (한명회, 韓明澮) (26 November 1415 - 28 November 1487)
 Great-Grandson - Han Bok (한복, 韓福)
 Great Granddaughter-in-law - Lady Jin of the Heungdeok Jin clan (흥덕 장씨)
 Great-Grandson - Han Im (한임, 韓林)
 Great Granddaughter-in-law - Lady Yi of the Jeonju Yi clan (전주 이씨); daughter of Yi Han-gi (이한기, 李漢奇)
 Great-Grandson - Han Su (한수, 韓壽)
 Great Granddaughter-in-law - Lady Kwon of the Andong Kwon clan (안동 권씨)

The poems

Yi Bang-won's sijo (poem) - Hayeoga (하여가, 何如歌)

이런들 어떠하리 저런들 어떠하리此亦何如彼亦何如。(차역하여피역하여)

만수산 드렁칡이 얽어진들 어떠하리城隍堂後垣頹落亦何如。(성황당후원퇴락역하여)

우리도 이같이 얽어져 백년까지 누리리라我輩若此爲不死亦何如。(아배약차위불사역하여)

(Based on the Hanja)

What shall it be: this or that?

The walls behind the temple of the city's deity* has fallen - shall it be this?

Or if we survive together nonetheless - shall it be that?

(* Yi Bang-won is declaring the death of the era - the Goryeo Dynasty.)

Jeong Mong-ju's sijo (poem) - Dansimga (단심가, 丹心歌)

이몸이 죽고 죽어 일백 번 고쳐 죽어此身死了死了一百番更死了。(차신사료사료일백번갱사료)

백골이 진토되어 넋이라도 있고 없고白骨爲塵土魂魄有也無。(백골위진토혼백유무야)

임 향한 일편 단심이야 가실 줄이 있으랴向主一片丹心寧有改理也歟。(향주일편단심유개리여)

Though I die and die again a hundred times,

That my bones turn to dust, whether my soul remains or not,

Ever loyal to my Lord, how can this red heart ever fade away?

Books
Poeun Jip (포은집, 圃隱集)
Poeun Sigo (포은시고, 圃隱詩藁)

In popular culture
 Portrayed by Hong Gye-il in the 1983 MBC TV series The King of Chudong Palace.
 Portrayed by Park Joon-hyuk in the 2012-2013 SBS TV series The Great Seer.
 Portrayed by Im Ho in the 2014 KBS1 TV  series Jeong Do-jeon.
 Portrayed by Kim Eui-sung in the 2015 SBS TV series Six Flying Dragons.
 Portrayed by Choi Jong-hwan in the 2021 KBS1 TV series Taejong Yi Bang-won.

See also
List of Goryeo people
Korean philosophy
Tears of the Dragon (TV series)
Jeong Do-jeon

Notes

References
Kang, Jae-eun; Lee, Suzanne (translator). (2006). The Land of Scholars: Two Thousand Years of Korean Confucianism. Paramus, New Jersey: Homa & Sekey Books. ; OCLC 60931394
Titsingh, Isaac. (1834).   Annales des empereurs du Japon (Nihon Ōdai Ichiran).  Paris: Oriental Translation Fund of Great Britain and Ireland.  OCLC  84067437

Korean diplomats
Korean Confucianists
People murdered in Korea
Korean revolutionaries
Korean educators
Neo-Confucian scholars
1338 births
1392 deaths
14th-century Korean poets
Korean male poets
14th-century Korean calligraphers
14th-century Korean philosophers
People from Yeongcheon